The 1994–95 Honduran Segunda División was the 28th season of the Honduran Segunda División.  Under the management of Carlos Tábora, Independiente Villela won the tournament after finishing first in the final round (or Octagonal) and obtained promotion to the 1995–96 Honduran Liga Nacional.

Final round
Also known as Octagonal.

Standings

Known results

References

Segunda
1994